Paddy Griffith (4 February 1947, Liverpool, England – 25 June 2010) was a British military theorist and historian, who authored numerous books in the field of War Studies. He was also a wargame designer for the UK Ministry of Defence, and a leading figure in the wargaming community.

Academic life
Griffith was a freelance military historian and a prolific author on military history and tactics. He was educated at Corpus Christi College, Oxford, where he obtained a first-class honours degree in Modern History. He was a lecturer and then senior lecturer at RMA Sandhurst from 1973–89.

Forward into Battle
In Forward into Battle: Fighting Tactics from Waterloo to Vietnam (1981), Griffith put forward ideas about the "empty battlefield" or how increased fire-power had led to military formations becoming increasingly disaggregated. The conclusion he drew was that the willingness to close with the enemy was a key factor. It proved to be a highly influential work.

Wargames
Griffith was the founder of the Wargame Developments Group and SMATS (South Manchester Tactical Society)  which is a reincarnation of the Manchester Tactical Society founded by Spenser Wilkinson in the 1880s. He was the author of numerous books in the field of War Studies and a wargame designer for the UK Ministry of Defence.

Wargames Developments and COW
In 1980 while still a lecturer in War Studies at RMA Sandhurst, organised a conference, "New Directions in Wargaming", held at Moor Park, Farnham, which lasted an entire weekend (23–25 May 1980). He was the primary force behind the foundation of Wargame Developments, a group consisting of professional military personnel, civil servants, educators, and both professional and amateur wargame designers. Since 1981, the  Conference of Wargamers (COW) have been held at Knuston Hall Residential College for Adult Education. The typical COW consists of presentations in the form of papers and lectures, workshops, and practical sessions.

Beginning in November 1980, the Wargame Developments group has published a regular journal, The Nugget. Currently there are nine issues distributed annually. It is subscribed to by a wide range of people, including professional military personnel and civilians. Griffith edited the first 15 issues, as well as the 50th. 

Griffith is credited with developing the megagame role-playing system.

Death
Griffith died of a heart attack on 25 June 2010, aged 63.

Publications

Works

References

External links
 Paddy Griffith's Web Site (archived in 2018)
 South Manchester Tactical Society founded by Paddy Griffith
 Link to wargames which Griffith designed

1947 births
2010 deaths
British military historians
Academics of the Royal Military Academy Sandhurst
Alumni of Corpus Christi College, Oxford
Historians of the French Revolution
Historians of the Napoleonic Wars
Historians of the American Civil War
Writers from Liverpool